"Mickey's Mechanical House" is a cartoon made by Walt Disney Television Animation. It was originally released in 1999. It was narrated by Monty Python member John Cleese.

Plot
This cartoon is narrated in rhyme. Mickey Mouse keeps trying to sleep while living in an old, unrepaired house, which constantly annoys him. Mickey decides to move out of it; he takes Pluto and runs down a sidewalk full of houses. Soon, he meets a salesman who is selling a modern and clean "electric house" where anything can be controlled by a push of a button on a remote control. Mickey, delighted that it was better than the other, buys the house and moves in it. At first, the mouse is happy with his new home, but the robotic servant (who refuses to let Mickey stay up to explore the house at night) and malfunctioning equipment make him change his mind and escape from the place. Eventually, Mickey changes his values and returns to live in his old house.

Cast
 Wayne Allwine as Mickey Mouse
 Bill Farmer as Pluto
 John Cleese as the Narrator
 Jeff Bennett as Salesman

References

Mickey Mouse short films
1999 films
1999 animated films
1990s Disney animated short films
Films scored by Stephen James Taylor